Winogradskyella litoriviva is a Gram-negative, facultatively anaerobic and moderately halophilic bacterium from the genus of Winogradskyella which has been isolated from seawater from the coast of Troitsa Bay.

References

Flavobacteria
Bacteria described in 2015